Gordon Dooley (13 August 1898 - 23 January 1930) was an American vaudeville comedian and eccentric dancer.

He was born in Altoona, Pennsylvania, to Robert Roger Dooley (originally Dool), a circus performer, and his wife, Mary, both emigrants from Scotland. His two brothers, William (1882-1921), and Johnny (1887-1928), and his sister, Ray, were all performers.

Gordon Dooley suffered a nervous breakdown in May 1929. He died of pneumonia in Philadelphia, Pennsylvania, the next year at age 31, and was buried in Holy Cross Cemetery in Yeadon, Pennsylvania.

External links

References

1898 births
1930 deaths
Eccentric dancers
Vaudeville performers
Deaths from pneumonia in Pennsylvania
American people of Scottish descent